The CONCACAF Cup Winners Cup was an international association football club competition held from 1991 to 1998.

The cup was between the winners of their nation's domestic cup competitions, which posed a problem as some participating countries did not have a cup competition.  The last three competitions were abandoned and never finished.  In 2001, the Cup Winners Cup then became the CONCACAF Giants Cup.

CONCACAF Cup Winners Cup

CONCACAF Giants Cup

Scorers

Top scorers by year

References

External links
 RSSSF: CONCACAF Cup Winners Cup

 
Defunct CONCACAF club competitions
Recurring sporting events established in 1991
Recurring events disestablished in 2001
1991 establishments in North America
2001 disestablishments in North America